Although being part of the Middle East, which is often known for its success in Asian football, Yemen is not considered as a very successful team compared to their neighbors. Despite having youth teams participate in big tournaments, notably their under-17 team who played in one FIFA U-17 World Cup, Yemen has remained under the shadow of other Arab teams, often failing to qualify for major tournaments. Since the Yemeni Civil War erupted in 2015, Yemen has been unable to play at their home ground. Against all odds, Yemen managed history and become the last Arab team in the Middle East to qualify for the AFC Asian Cup. They made their tournament debut in 2019.

Asian Cup performance

2019 Asian Cup

Group D

References

Countries at the AFC Asian Cup
AFC Cup